Dooley ministry may refer to:
 Dooley ministry (1921), the 38th ministry of the New South Wales Government, 10 October 1921–20 December 1921
 Dooley ministry (1921–1922), the 40th ministry of the New South Wales Government, 20 December 1921–13 April 1922